Melin Adda is a windmill near Amlwch, Ynys Môn, (OS reference: SH 440921) which was built in the 1790s and closed down in 1912. The mill was turned into a house in the 1970s. Nearby stood another mill, which was water driven, a much older mill, dating back to 1352.

In 1851 it is recorded that Owen Hughes the miller at the time was killed after being struck by the sail's boom.

Nearby windmills in the Amlwch area

References

External links
amlwchhistory.com; images

Windmills in Anglesey
Grade II listed buildings in Anglesey